Ma'ale Efrayim (lit. Ascent of Ephraim) is an Israeli settlement in the West Bank, organized as a secular settlement and a local council, located along the eastern slopes of the Samarian mountains in the Jordan Valley. It was founded in 1978 and named after the Biblical tribe of Ephraim. The settlement's municipal status was upgraded to local council in 1981.

The international community considers Israeli settlements in the West Bank illegal under international law, but the Israeli government disputes this.

History
According to ARIJ, in 1970 Israel retook 1,464 dunams of land from the Jordanians which was stolen from Jewish landowners in The War of Independence in order to construct  Ma'ale Efrayim.

References

External links
 Official website

Israeli settlements in the West Bank
Populated places established in 1978
Local councils in Israel
Mixed Israeli settlements
1978 establishments in the Israeli Military Governorate